Bishop McDevitt High School is a private, Roman Catholic, co-educational high school in Harrisburg, Pennsylvania, United States. It was founded in 1918 as "Catholic High School" in Harrisburg and renamed in 1957 to honor the memory of the Most Reverend Philip R. McDevitt, fourth bishop of Harrisburg and founder of the school. 

It is located in the Roman Catholic Diocese of Harrisburg.

History
Founded in 1918, this private, Pennsylvania high school was renamed in 1957 to honor the memory of the Most Reverend Philip R. McDevitt, fourth bishop of Harrisburg and founder of the school. 

On January 7, 2013, the new Bishop McDevitt High School opened on 1 Crusader Way. It replaced the historic building at 2200 Market Street after 70 years.

Athletics 
Bishop McDevitt is a part of Pennsylvania Interscholastic Athletic Association District 3. McDevitt is known for its athletics especially the football team.  Other sports at McDevitt include: Boys & Girls Basketball, Boys & Girls Soccer, Coed Cross Country, Coed Track & Field, Coed Golf, Field Hockey, Boys & Girls Tennis, Wrestling, Coed Swimming, Coed Bowling, Cheerleading, Ice Hockey, Volleyball, Baseball, Softball, and Lacrosse.

 1995 State AA Football Champions 
 2004, 2005, 2010, 2011, 2012,  2013, 2014, 2015, 2018, & 2021 District 3 Football Champions
 2009 State AA Boys Track & Field Champions
 2010, 2011 , 2013 & 2021 District 3 Football Champions and State Runner-up
 2010 MidPenn Champions Girls Track and Field
 2011 District 3 AA Girls Track & Field Champions
 2011 Conference Undefeated Title Girls Track and Field
 2011 MidPenn Champions Girls Track and Field
 2012 District 3 AA Girls Soccer Champions
 2022 State AAAA Football Champions

Notable alumni 
 Michael Behe, biochemist and Lehigh University professor
 Aaron Berry, former professional football player, Cleveland Browns, Detroit Lions, and New York Jets
 Margaret Carlson, columnist, Bloomberg News
 Larry Conjar, former professional football player, Baltimore Colts, Cleveland Browns, and Philadelphia Eagles
 Don Falcone, progressive rock musician
 Carmen Finestra, producer and TV writer, The Cosby Show
 Bryce Hall, professional football player, New York Jets
 Connor Maloney, professional soccer player, San Antonio FC
 LeRon McCoy, former professional football player, Arizona Cardinals and San Francisco 49ers
 LeSean McCoy, former professional football player, Buffalo Bills, Kansas City Chiefs, Philadelphia Eagles, and Tampa Bay Buccaneers
 Andy Panko, former professional basketball player, Atlanta Hawks
 Steven Pasquale, actor, Rescue Me
 Stephen R. Reed, former Harrisburg mayor
 Noah Spence, former professional football player, Cincinnati Bengals, New Orleans Saints, Tampa Bay Buccaneers, and Washington Redskins
 Jaimie Thomas, former professional football player, Indianapolis Colts
 Ricky Watters, former professional football player, Philadelphia Eagles, San Francisco 49ers, and Seattle Seahawks

References

External links
Bishop McDevitt High School (official website)

Education in Harrisburg, Pennsylvania
Schools in Dauphin County, Pennsylvania
Catholic secondary schools in Pennsylvania
Roman Catholic Diocese of Harrisburg
Educational institutions established in 1918
1918 establishments in Pennsylvania